Lancaster Township is one of nine townships in Wells County, Indiana, United States. As of the 2010 census, its population was 5,705 and it contained 2,570 housing units.

Geography

Cities, towns, villages
 Bluffton (the county seat) (north half)

Unincorporated towns
 Craigville at 
 Curryville at 
 Murray at 
 North Oaks at 
 Tocsin at 
 Toll Gate Heights at 
(This list is based on USGS data and may include former settlements.)

Adjacent townships
 Jefferson Township (north)
 Preble Township, Adams County (northeast)
 Kirkland Township, Adams County (east)
 Harrison Township (south)
 Liberty Township (southwest)
 Rockcreek Township (west)
 Union Township (northwest)

Cemeteries
The township contains four cemeteries: Fair View, Murray, Oakland, and Old Bluffton.

Airports and landing strips
 The Lazy K Airport

The "K" stands for Kunkel. Arden G. Kunkel established the grass strip airport in 1963. It was most recently owned and operated by Terry and Annie Hoffmeier. Annie is the youngest daughter of the late Arden G. Kunkel. It was a private airport and is restricted to hours of operation and plane usage. In May of 2013, the airport and runways shut down after 50 years of operation.

School districts
 Northern Wells Community Schools

Political districts
 Indiana's 6th congressional district
 State House District 79
 State House District 82
 State Senate District 19

References
 United States Census Bureau 2007 TIGER/Line Shapefiles
 United States Board on Geographic Names (GNIS)
 IndianaMap

External links
 Indiana Township Association
 United Township Association of Indiana

Townships in Wells County, Indiana
Fort Wayne, IN Metropolitan Statistical Area
Townships in Indiana